A by-election was held in the Cook Islands electorate of Titikaveka on 21 June 2012.  The by-election was precipitated by the death of sitting MP Robert Wigmore on 13 April 2012.

The election was contested by three candidates, two of whom were siblings.  It was won by the Democratic party's Selina Napa.

Aftermath
On 5 July, Teariki Matenga challenged the result, questioning the eligibility of 20 voters.  The petition was withdrawn in August.

References

By-elections in the Cook Islands
2012 elections in Oceania
2012 in the Cook Islands